The Medusa is the second studio album released by New Zealand rock group, Tadpole on September 15, 2002. It was recorded over late 2001-early 2002 and was produced by Malcolm Welsford via Antenna Recordings.

Cover art
The cover art features Greek mythology's Medusa designed by Geoff Smith at Outer Aspect, with additional artwork by Monique Facon. The 2002 pressings of the album cover were innovative, due to the use of a 3D hologram cover design. To save on costs, the cover from 2003 onward did not have the hologram, instead it included a booklet with lyrics.

Chart performance
The Medusa entered the New Zealand Top 40 Albums chart and peaked at #10 on September 15, 2002. The album spent a total of nine weeks on the chart and became Tadpole's second album to reach the top 10.

Track listing
Track listing adapted from Spotify. All tracks are written by Renée Brennan, Dean Lawton, and Chris Yong.

Personnel 
Personnel are adapted from the album's liner notes and AudioCulture.

Tadpole 
Renée Brennan – vocals
Shannon Brown – bass guitar
Dean "Dino" Lawton – drums
Chris Yong – guitar

Additional personnel 
Monique Facon – additional artwork
Paul Rhodes – musical direction
Geoff Smith – 3D cover artwork
Malcolm Welsford – production, engineering

Charts

References

Tadpole (band) albums
2002 albums